Aritz Solabarrieta Aranzamendi (born 22 July 1983) is a Spanish retired footballer who played mainly as a right midfielder, currently a manager.

Playing career

Club
Born in Ondarroa, Basque Country and a product of Athletic Bilbao's prolific youth ranks at Lezama, Solabarrieta played only one full season for its first team, 2004–05, helping with 11 matches as the Basque finished ninth. His La Liga debut came on 13 November 2004 in a 2–1 home win against Villarreal CF, as he came on as a substitute for Andoni Iraola in injury time.

After a loan with neighbours SD Eibar of Segunda División, which ended in relegation, Solabarrieta was released by the Lions in December 2006 and resumed his career in the Segunda División B, starting with Atlético Madrid B. He retired in June 2015 at the age of nearly 32, after two years with amateurs CD Aurrerá Ondarroa in his hometown.

International
Solabarrieta won 16 caps for Spain at youth level, including two for the under-21 side. His first appearance for the latter occurred on 17 August 2004, as he featured 22 minutes in a 1–1 friendly draw in France.

Coaching career
After his playing days ended, Solabarrieta embarked on a career as a coach. In 2016, he was appointed as manager of Athletic Bilbao's Cadete A youth team. The following year, he moved to control the Juvenil A squad.

Due to a combination of a disappointing campaign for the CD Basconia farm team coached by Ander Alaña and Solabarrieta's good work with the youths, the two men swapped roles within the club's structure for 2018–19. However, he was soon promoted again when Gaizka Garitano, coach of the reserve side, was selected to take the helm of the senior team in December 2018, in turn leaving a vacancy at Athletic Bilbao B which Solabarrieta was nominated to fill.

Solabarrieta signed as coach of third-tier Racing de Santander on 21 December 2020.

Managerial statistics

Honours
Spain U17
UEFA–CAF Meridian Cup: 2001

Spain U19
UEFA European Under-19 Championship: 2002

References

External links

1983 births
Living people
People from Ondarroa
Sportspeople from Biscay
Spanish footballers
Footballers from the Basque Country (autonomous community)
Association football midfielders
La Liga players
Segunda División players
Segunda División B players
Tercera División players
CD Basconia footballers
Bilbao Athletic footballers
Athletic Bilbao footballers
SD Eibar footballers
Atlético Madrid B players
Real Jaén footballers
CF Palencia footballers
UD Melilla footballers
Sestao River footballers
Spain youth international footballers
Spain under-21 international footballers
Spanish football managers
Segunda División B managers
Tercera División managers
CD Basconia managers
Athletic Bilbao B managers
Racing de Santander managers
Athletic Bilbao non-playing staff